The men's 100 metre breaststroke event at the 2015 European Games in Baku took place on 26 and 27 June at the Aquatic Palace.

Results

Heats
The heats were started on 26 June at 11:06.

Semifinals
The semifinals were started on 26 June at 18:41.

Semifinal 1

Semifinal 2

Final
The final was held on 27 June at 17:56.

References

Men's 100 metre breaststroke